Wade McCollum (born 1978) is an American film actor, stage actor and composer/musician.

Early life 
McCollum was born in 1978 in Chico, California. His father is a rock-n-roll drummer and McCollum spent his early life on the road traveling from town to town. He spent some school years in Ashland, Oregon, home of the Oregon Shakespeare Festival. He left High School at age 16 to attend the Pacific Conservatory of the Performing Arts.

Career
After graduating from the Pacific Conservatory of the Performing Arts, McCollum went on to land the role of Hedwig in a 2002 Triangle Theatre production of John Cameron Mitchell and Stephen Trask’s rock musical Hedwig and the Angry Inch. McCollum went on to star in several productions of Hedwig and the Angry Inch, including the Ovation Award-winning 2004 Celebration Theatre production in Hollywood, CA. For this production McCollum won the Backstage West Garland Award, The Los Angeles Drama Critic’s Circle Award and was praised by publications such as Variety and the Los Angeles Times.

McCollum released a music album called Beauty is a Streetlight in 2006.

While in Portland, McCollum appeared as Frank-n-Furter in The Rocky Horror Picture Show, the Emcee in Cabaret opposite Storm Large as Sally Bowles, and Prior in Angels in America. At Portland Center Stage, he starred as Batboy in Bat Boy: The Musical and the one-person shows I Am My Own Wife[23] and The Santaland Diaries.[29][51] McCollum also co-founded and functioned as artistic director of Insight Out Theatre Collective where his hit original musical ONE  (aka The Other Shore) was produced.[52] ONE was still in development for commercial production, as of 2022.

McCollum went on to appear in Jersey Boys, led Broadway’s Priscilla Queen of the Desert First National Tour, and upon his return to New York City, made his Broadway debut in Wicked. McCollum has appeared in numerous Off-Broadway shows including Triassic Parq and most notably his Lucille Lortel Award nominated turn as Ernest Shackleton in Ernest Shackleton Loves Me, for which he garnered the prestigious Norton Award for “Best Actor” with the show winning the Off-Broadway Alliance Award for Best Musical in 2017 Ernest Shackleton Loves Me was streamed live during its run in NYC and available on Broadway HD.

In 2011 McCollum appeared as the Emcee in Dallas Theatre Center’s Cabaret opposite Kate Wetherhead as Sally Bowles. Wetherhead is the creator of the Web Comedy Submissions Only in which McCollum played Nolan Grigsby.

In 2018, McCollum originated the role of Carl von Cosel in the new musical It Happened In Key West on London’s West End.

McCollum’s first performance back in the theatre after the  Covid-19 shutdown was as a last-minute emergency cover for Henry Higgins in Lincoln Center Theatre’s national tour of My Fair Lady directed by Bartlett Sher.

In 2022 McCollum  completed Secondary Dominance, his first feature film as co-director and co-writer with longtime collaborator Sarah Small.

Personal life 
McCollum is married to artist Noah Jordan. McCollum’s father-in-law is 2012 Nobel Prize in Chemistry winner Robert Lefkowitz.

Filmography

Film

Television

Theater

Other theaters
 Mary in On the Verge
 Sid ONE, an earlier version of the musical he wrote and co-composed with Eric Nordin.

Awards

References

External links
 Official website
 

American male film actors
American male stage actors
Living people
Pacific Conservatory of the Performing Arts alumni
American male web series actors
21st-century American male actors
1978 births